Sens-Beaujeu is a commune in the Cher department in the Centre-Val de Loire region of France.

Geography

Population

Sights
 The church of St. Caprais, dating from the thirteenth century.
 Two feudal mottes.
 The sixteenth-century chateau of Beaujeu, now a hotel.
 Two watermills.

See also
Communes of the Cher department

References

Communes of Cher (department)